Peter Miles Anson Sherwood is Dean Emeritus and Regents Professor, Emeritus, College of Arts and Sciences at Oklahoma State University, Oklahoma, United States.   He is also a University Distinguished Professor Emeritus of Chemistry at Kansas State University.

He obtained his B.Sc., St. Andrews University, Scotland, Chemistry; M.A., Ph.D., Sc.D. Cambridge University.

References

Year of birth missing (living people)
Living people
Oklahoma State University faculty
Fellows of the Institute of Physics
Alumni of the University of Cambridge
Fellows of Downing College, Cambridge
Alumni of the University of St Andrews